Katarzyna Solus-Miśkowicz (born 21 March 1988) is a mountain biker and road racing cyclist from Poland. She represented her nation at the 2010 UCI Mountain Bike & Trials World Championships – Women's cross-country in the under-23 category. At the 2014 World University Cycling Championship she won both mountain bike disciplines, the mass start and time trial and won the silver medal in the road race. She was on the start list of 2018 Cross-Country European Championships and finished 25.

References

External links
 profile at Cyclingarchives.com

1988 births
Polish female cyclists
Living people
Sportspeople from Zakopane
Olympic cyclists of Poland
Cyclists at the 2016 Summer Olympics
21st-century Polish women